Columnea domingensis is a species of plant in the family Gesneriaceae. According to Liogier it can be found in the Dominican Republic and in Haiti.

Etymology
The species has been given the specific epithet "domingensis", as it occurs on the island of Hispaniola. This island was historically called Santo Domingo, or Saint-Domingue.

References

External links

domingensis